The tribe Diocleae is one of the subdivisions of the plant family Fabaceae.

The Diocleae can be distinguished from other members of Fabaceae by
[A] combination of features involving the woody vine or shrub habit, stipellate trifoliolate leaves, nodose pseudoraceme inflorescence, flowers with a distinct hypanthium, and calyx with lanceolate lobes, the lower lobe longer than the remaining (except in the specialized resupinate flowers of Canavalia).

Genera
Diocleae contains the following genera:
 Canavalia Clade
 Canavalia Adans.
 Dioclea Clade
 Cleobulia Mart. ex Benth.
 Cymbosema Benth.
 Dioclea Kunth
 Macropsychanthus Harms ex K. Schum. & Lauterb.
 Galactia Clade
 Bionia Mart.
 Camptosema Hook. & Arn.
 Collaea DC.
 Cratylia Mart. ex Benth.
 Galactia P. Browne
 Lackeya Fortunato et al.
 Neorudolphia Britton
 Rhodopis Urb.

References

External links

Faboideae
Fabaceae tribes